Bicaudal D cargo adaptor 1 is a protein that in humans is encoded by the BICD1 gene.

Function 

This gene is one of two human homologs of Drosophila bicaudal-D. It has been implicated in COPI-independent membrane transport from the Golgi apparatus to the endoplasmic reticulum. Two alternative splice variants have been described. Other alternative splice variants that encode different protein isoforms have been described but their full-length nature has not been determined.

Interactions 

BICD1 has been shown to interact with RAB6A.

References

External links

Further reading